Slyudyanka is a town and the administrative center of Slyudyansky District of Irkutsk Oblast, Russia, located at the southern tip of Lake Baikal,  south of Irkutsk, the administrative center of the oblast. Population: 

The town is a stop and major railroad junction for the Trans-Siberian Railway, and also serves as the starting point for the historic Circum-Baikal Railway.

Etymology
The town takes its name from the Russian word for mica, reflecting the numerous mineral deposits in the area.

History

Slyudyanka railway station and a settlement around it were established in 1905. Town status was granted to it in 1936.

Administrative and municipal status
Within the framework of administrative divisions, Slyudyanka serves as the administrative center of Slyudyansky District, to which it is directly subordinated. As a municipal division, the town of Slyudyanka, together with two rural localities in Slyudyansky District, is incorporated within Slyudyansky Municipal District as Slyudyanskoye Urban Settlement.

References

Notes

Sources

Registry of the Administrative-Territorial Formations of Irkutsk Oblast

External links
 Official website of Slyudyanskoye Urban Settlement
 Official website of the Slyudyanka weekly newspaper Slavnoye More

Cities and towns in Irkutsk Oblast
Populated places on Lake Baikal